OPIE is the initialism of "One time Passwords In Everything". 
Opie is a mature, Unix-like login and password package 
installed on the server and the client which makes untrusted networks safer against password-sniffing packet-analysis software like dSniff and safe against Shoulder surfing.
It works by circumventing the delayed attack method because the same password is never used twice after installing Opie.  
OPIE implements a one-time password (OTP) scheme based on S/KEY, which will require a secret passphrase (not echoed) to generate a password for the current session, or a list of passwords you can print and carry on your person.

OPIE uses an MD4 or MD5 hash function to generate passwords.

OPIE can restrict its logins based on IP address. It uses its own passwd and login modules.

If the Enter key  is pressed at the password prompt, it will turn echo on, so what is being typed can be seen when entering an unfamiliar password from a printout.

OPIE will improve security when accessing online banking at conferences, hotels and airports.
Some countries require banks to implement OTP.

OPIE shipped with DragonFly BSD, FreeBSD and OpenSUSE. It can be installed on a Unix-like server and clients for improved security.

The commands are 
opiepasswd
opiekey

References
 OTPW

External links
 OPIE @ Linux wiki
 Opie text from FreeBSD Manual

Cryptographic software | Password authentication